is a passenger railway station located in the city of  Kakogawa, Hyōgo Prefecture, Japan, operated by the private Sanyo Electric Railway.

Lines

Station layout
The station consists of two unnumbered ground-level side platforms connected by an underground passage. The station is unattended.

Platforms

Adjacent stations

|-
!colspan=5|Sanyo Electric Railway

History
Onoenomatsu Station opened on 19 August 1923.

Passenger statistics
In fiscal 2018, the station was used by an average of 2167 passengers daily (boarding passengers only).

Surrounding area
 Kakurin-ji Temple 
 Onoe Shrine
Kakogawa City Wakamiya Elementary School

See also
List of railway stations in Japan

References

External links

  Official website (Sanyo Electric Railway) 

Railway stations in Japan opened in 1923
Railway stations in Hyōgo Prefecture
Kakogawa, Hyōgo